Linton Maina (born 23 June 1999) is a German professional footballer who plays as an attacking midfielder for Bundesliga club 1. FC Köln.

Career
Maina made his professional debut for Hannover 96 on 18 March 2018, coming on as a substitute for Marvin Bakalorz on matchday 27 of the 2017–18 season of the Bundesliga in a 0–1 away loss against Borussia Dortmund. 

On 19 May 2022, it was announced that Maina would join Bundesliga side 1. FC Köln for the 2022–23 season on a free transfer. He signed a contract with the team until 2025.

Personal life
Maina was born in Berlin to a Kenyan father and a German mother.

References

External links
 
 

1999 births
Living people
Footballers from Berlin
German people of Kenyan descent
German sportspeople of African descent
German footballers
Germany youth international footballers
Association football midfielders
Hannover 96 players
Bundesliga players
2. Bundesliga players
1. FC Köln players